Native American literature is literature, both oral and written, produced by Native Americans in what is now the United States (as distinct from First Nations writers in Canada), from pre-Columbian times through to today. Famous authors include N. Scott Momaday, Leslie Marmon Silko, Simon Ortiz, Louise Erdrich, Gerald Vizenor, Joy Harjo, Sherman Alexie, D'Arcy McNickle, James Welch, Charles Eastman, Mourning Dove, Zitkala-Sa, John Rollin Ridge, Lynn Riggs, Diane Glancy, Hanay Geiogamah, William Apess, Samson Occom, et al. Importantly, it is not "a" literature, but a set of literatures, since every tribe has its own cultural traditions. Since the 1960s, it has also become a significant field of literary studies, with academic journals, departments, and conferences devoted to the subject.

Oral traditions

Native American literatures come out of a rich set of oral traditions from before European contact and/or the later adoption of European writing practices. Oral traditions include not only narrative story-telling, but also the songs, chants, and poetry used for rituals and ceremonies. Many of these stories and songs were transcribed by anthropologists, but often with significant conflict with the tribes and often with significant misinterpretation and/or mistranslation.

Early literature
Many early Native American writers were political and/or autobiographical, which was often also political in that it was meant to persuade readers to push for better treatment of Native Americans. Samson Occom (Mohegan) was a Christian preacher who wrote not only his autobiography, A Short Narrative of My Life, but also many hymns. William Apess  (Pequot) wrote his autobiography, A Son of the Forest, as well as a public lecture/eulogy of King Philip. Sarah Winnemucca (Paiute) wrote about her tribe's first interactions with European Americans in Life Among the Paiutes, and John Rollin Ridge (Cherokee) wrote what is considered the first novel by a Native American, The Life and Adventures of Joaquín Murieta, about the infamous California bandit.

In the early 1900s, as white American audiences became interested in reading about the lives and cultures of Native Americans, Native American writers began transcribing the stories of their cultures, such as Charles Eastman's Old Indian Days and Mourning Dove's Coyote Tales. Others began to write fiction, for example, Mourning Dove's novel Cogewea and D'Arcy McNickle's The Surrounded. Other novelists include John Joseph Mathews and John Milton Oskison. Perhaps the best known Native American work from this period is Green Grow the Lilacs, a play by Cherokee author Lynn Riggs that became the basis for the musical Oklahoma! Many of these authors blended autobiography, traditional stories, fiction, and essays, as can be seen in Zitkala-Sa's (Dakota) American Indian Stories.

Native American Renaissance
The term "Native American Renaissance" was coined in 1983 by Kenneth Lincoln to describe the flowering of literary work by Native American writers in the late 1960s through the 1970s and into the 1980s. The focal point for the "arrival" of Native American literature as a significant literary event came with the first Pulitzer Prize awarded to a Native author, N. Scott Momaday (Kiowa) for his novel House Made of Dawn.

The 1970s saw important fiction by James Welch (Blackfeet and A-aninin), Leslie Marmon Silko (Laguna), and Gerald Vizenor (Chippewa), and poetry by Joy Harjo (Muscogee), Simon J. Ortiz (Acoma), and Wendy Rose (Hopi/Miwok). Many authors have done significant work in both genres, such as Joseph Bruchac (Abenaki).

The 1980s saw many of the writers listed above continuing to produce new literature. New voices included Louise Erdrich (Ojibwe), Paula Gunn Allen (Laguna), Linda Hogan (Chickasaw), Michael Dorris, and Luci Tapahonso (Navajo).

The 1990s introduced several works of poetry and of prose fiction by Spokane/Coeur D'Alene author Sherman Alexie. Chickasaw author Linda Hogan's Mean Spirit was a finalist for the 1991 Pulitzer Prize for Fiction.

21st-century literature
In 2021, Louise Erdrich was a Pulitzer Prize for Fiction winner for The Night Watchman. 

In 2019, Joy Harjo (Muscogee Nation) became the first Native American to hold the post of United States Poet Laureate.

Also in 2019, Tommy Orange's (Cheyenne & Arapaho) novel about urban Indian life in California, There There, was a finalist for the Pulitzer Prize for Fiction.

Themes and threads
Trauma and Healing
Mixed-bloods
Ceremonies

See also
 American Indian literary nationalism
 Native American Renaissance
 Studies in American Indian Literatures
 Native American Literature Symposium
 Wordcraft Circle of Native Writers and Storytellers
 List of writers from peoples indigenous to the Americas
 Native American studies
 List of Native American languages in the United States
 American Indian English

External sources
Articles on Native American writers in Western American Literature

References

Native American literature
American literature by ethnic background
Native American culture